Abhimaan (translation: Pride) is a TV series produced by Siddhant Cinevision, broadcast on Doordarshan in 1999–2000.

Cast 
 Kanwaljit Singh as Mr. Sehgal, a politician
 Mohan Bhandari as Mohan Kumar Chauhan, an industrialist
 Kishori Shahane as Sukanya Mohan Kumar Chauhan
 Kabir Sadanand as Sanjay Chauhan
 Govind Namdev as Police Commissionar Tyagi
 Arundhati Ganorkar as Journalist Kanak Sharma
 Sonam Malhotra as Aishwarya Sehgal / Aishwarya Jaydev Mehra
 Sachin Khedekar as Jaydev Mehra
 Divya Seth as Rajeshwari Sehgal (dead)
 Rajeev Paul as Naresh Sehgal
 Raviraj
 Moonmoon Banerjee as Kajri
 Vaquar Shaikh as Inspector Siddhanth 
 Sweta Keswani as Dolly Tyagi / Dolly Naresh Sehgal
 Shishir Sharma as D.I.G.
 Sanjay Batra
 Sushil Parashar
 Aliya Khan
 Bhupendra Awasthi as Mr. Sharma, Kanak's father (dead)
 Ravee Gupta
 Deepshikha Nagpal as Anita
 Kiran Karmarkar as Sukhdev Mehra

References

External links 
 Abhimaan title song on YouTube

DD National original programming
1999 Indian television series debuts
2000 Indian television series endings
Indian drama television series